PotPlayer is a multimedia software player developed for the Microsoft Windows operating system by South Korean Internet company Kakao (formerly Daum Communications). It competes with other popular Windows media players such as VLC media player, mpv (media player), GOM Player, KMPlayer, SMPlayer and Media Player Classic. PotPlayer's reception has been positive with reviewers complimenting its wide range of settings and customizations, its lightweight nature and its support for a large variety of media formats.

LifeHacker observed that PotPlayer's quantity of options was one of its biggest weaknesses—"It has many different settings[,] which unfortunately makes wading through the checkbox-laden settings menu kind of a pain"—and that its options menu was "confusing".

In 2019, some versions of PotPlayer began to be bundled with third-party software, causing concerns from its user community; however, the installers allowed users to opt-out before the extra software was installed. The player also started showing ads in its lower right-hand corner.

See also
 K-Multimedia Player (also by Kang Yong-Huee)
 Comparison of video player software

References

External links
 

Windows media players
Windows-only freeware
Media players
Kakao